Gold Flat is an unincorporated community in Nevada County, California. It lies at an elevation of 2651 feet (808 m).

References

Unincorporated communities in California
Unincorporated communities in Nevada County, California